The Aurora powerhouse is an advanced fission plant concept design that received a site use permit for testing in 2020 from the United States Department of Energy (DOE). The site use permit, issued in December 2019 is not a Nuclear Regulatory Commission permit. It is the "first and only permit ever issued in the U.S. to a nuclear plant using something other than a light water ("water-cooled") reactor". It will use "recycled" high-assay, low-enriched uranium (HALEU) fuel originally fabricated for the Experimental Breeder Reactor II (EBR-II), and if fully operational, would become "the first fuel-recycling commercial reactor in the United States". The DOE's Idaho National Laboratory (INL) said it would provide 10 tons of HALEU for the test reactor which corresponds to most of the available supply. Reprocessing would occur at INL's Materials and Fuels Complex (MFC) and possibly also the Idaho Nuclear Technology and Engineering Center (INTEC), neither of which are operational facilities as of early 2020.

The reactor design is a fast-neutron reactor with heat pipe cooling similar to the NASA Kilopower reactor. According to the designers, the reactor will have a "large negative temperature reactivity coefficient", lacks pumps and valves, uses heat pipes for heat removal, has no nuclear refueling intervals and associated core exposure, and its core is buried underground. In presenting its safety design to the Nuclear Regulatory Commission, Oklo quoted a study of the EBR-II, which is a different reactor technology, as being "inherently protected without requiring emergency power, safety systems, or operator intervention".

The Aurora is being developed by Oklo Inc. Oklo Inc was founded in 2014, with investors including Hydrazine Capital (founded by Sam Altman, with Peter Thiel as its sole limited partner); Facebook’s co-founder, Dustin Moskovitz; Ron Conway of SV Angels; Kevin Efrusy, a technology investor at Accel Partners; Daniel Aegerter, a Swiss investor and entrepreneur, Tim Draper of Draper Associates, Crunchfund, and several smaller investors including early employees of Google and Yahoo.

On January 6, 2022, the Nuclear Regulatory Commission denied Oklo's combined license application due to lack of information regarding several key topics for the Aurora reactor.

References

Further reading
 Oklo Power Combined Operating License Application for the Aurora at INL. Accession Number: ML20075A000, Nuclear Regulatory Commission

Fast-neutron reactors
Nuclear power in the United States
Nuclear research reactors
Proposed nuclear power stations in the United States